The Basketball Africa League Manute Bol Sportsmanship Award is an annual Basketball Africa League (BAL) award given to the player "for exemplifying ideals of sportsmanship on the court with ethical behavior, fair play, and integrity". The award is named after South Sudanese basketball legend Manute Bol. The award was first handed out in the inaugural season to Makrem Ben Romdhane.

Winners

References

Sportsmanship Award